Sir Thomas Newcomen, 8th Baronet (1740 – 27 April 1789) was an Anglo-Irish politician.

He was the son of Sir Arthur Newcomen, 7th Baronet and succeeded to his baronetcy upon his father's death on 25 November 1759. He sat in the Irish House of Commons as the Member of Parliament for Longford County from 1759 and 1760. He then represented Longford Borough between 1761 and 1768. His title became extinct upon his death.

References

1740 births
1789 deaths
18th-century Anglo-Irish people
Baronets in the Baronetage of Ireland
Irish MPs 1727–1760
Irish MPs 1761–1768
Members of the Parliament of Ireland (pre-1801) for County Longford constituencies
Newcomen family